James Raglan (6 January 1901 – 15 November 1961) was a British stage, film and television actor.

In Australia
Early in 1935 he was brought out to Australia with the Gabriel Toyne company by J. C. Williamson, playing Laburnum Grove and Michael Egan's The Dominant Sex. During this time he had appeared in the radio serials The Scarlet Pimpernel and Khyber by Edmund Barclay, in both series opposite Hilda Scurr. His stage contract over, he stayed behind, as leading man with Sydney radio station 2GB's B.S.A. Players, starring in its first comedy success Dolly and Dan. After a brief appearance in the 1936 film The Flying Doctor, he joined the ABC where he played in Edmund Barclay's As Ye Sow, Noël Coward's Cavalcade, Max Afford's Fly by Night and Edmund Barclay's Into the Light. He made two more films: Lovers and Luggers and Mr Chedworth Steps Out. He founded a production company "Raglan Radio Recordings", making a number of adventure serials. But despite having some excellent actors (including Peter Finch and Nigel Lovell) under contract, his venture failed and he returned to England in 1939.

Selected filmography
 The Forger (1928) - Peter Clifton
 The Man Who Changed His Name (1928) - Frank O'Ryan
 The Last Hour (1930) - Charles Lister
 Red Aces (1930) - Rufus Machfield
 The Chinese Puzzle (1932) - Sir Charles
 The World, the Flesh, the Devil (1932) - Robert Hall
 The Shadow (1933) - Beverley Kent
 The Admiral's Secret (1934) - Frank Bruce
 Jew Süss (1934) - Lord Suffolk
 Rolling Home (1935) - Captain Pengelly
 The Morals of Marcus (1935)
 The Flying Doctor (1936) - Dr. John Vaughan
 Lovers and Luggers (1938) - Bill Craig, alias Craig Henderson
 Mr. Chedworth Steps Out (1939) - Brian Carford
 Dick Barton Strikes Back (1949) - Lord Armadale
 Doctor Morelle (1949)
 Celia (1949) - Inspector Parker
 Whispering Smith Hits London (1951) - Supt. Meaker
 The Floating Dutchman (1952) - Mr. Wynn
 The Broken Horseshoe (1953) - Supt. Grayson
 Operation Diplomat (1953) - Sir Oliver Peters
 The Black Rider (1954) - Rackton
 Fabian of the Yard (1954)
 No Smoking (1955) - Chancellor
 The Birthday Present (1957) - Prison Governor (uncredited)
 Chain of Events (1958) - Magistrate
 Dangerous Afternoon (1961) - Sir Phillip Morstan (Last appearance)

Television appearances
 The Three Musketeers (1954) - D'Artagnan the Elder
 Mary Britten, M.D. (1958) -  Walter Davis
 No Hiding Place (1960) - Commander Hutchins

References

External links
 
 

1901 births
1961 deaths
English male film actors
People from Redhill, Surrey
Male actors from Surrey
English male stage actors
English male radio actors
English male television actors
20th-century English male actors